The Prandi is a -long river in Järva County, Estonia. Its source is Prandi Allikajärv in Prandi village, Koigi Parish. It is a left tributary of the Pärnu into which it flows near Särevere in Vilita. The basin area of Prandi is 285 km2.

References

Rivers of Estonia
Landforms of Järva County